Peter And The Wolf / The Sorcerer's Apprentice is a record album by Walt Disney Productions.

Stories
 Side one: "Peter and the Wolf", composed by Sergei Prokofiev
 Side two: "The Sorcerer's Apprentice", composed by Paul Dukas, conducted by Leopold Stokowski

References
 http://www.mousevinyl.com/content/peter-and-wolf-sorcerers-apprentice-disneyland-records

1972 albums
Disney albums
Classical music compilation albums
Children's music albums